Arkansas Creek is a stream in the U.S. state of Washington.

Arkansas Creek was named after the state of Arkansas, the native home of a large share of the first settlers.

See also
List of rivers of Washington

References

Rivers of Cowlitz County, Washington
Rivers of Washington (state)